Camp Curtis Guild is a Massachusetts Army National Guard camp located in the towns of Reading, Lynnfield, and Wakefield, Massachusetts.  It is named after former Massachusetts governor Curtis Guild, Jr.

During World War II the camp was one of the embarkation camps under the command of the Boston Port of Embarkation.

History
During World War I, the site was leased from the Bay State Rifle Association by the United States Navy.  The area then became known as Camp Plunkett and wooden barracks and mess halls were erected on the site.  After the war, the land was returned to the association.

In 1926, and at a cost of $64,000 dollars, the land was bought by the Commonwealth of Massachusetts.  On March 1 of that year, Governor Alvin T. Fuller named the camp in honor of the former governor Curtis Guild, Jr. “in consideration of [his] public service and intimate connection with the military forces of the state and nation.”

During the time period between 1933 and 1936, a Works Progress Administration camp was operated by the state on the site.  Several wood-frame buildings were also erected on the site during this time.

During World War II, the camp was operated  as a staging area by the First Service Command under the command of and for the Boston Port of Embarkation.  The camp was also utilized by the United States Coast Guard, as well for training.

In 1992, the army conducted a Lyme Disease Risk Assessment and noted that the disease was present in ticks at the facility, as well as the presence of human Lyme disease cases in the surrounding area.

In 1968 the site was selected to host the Boston-area Sentinel ABM, but fierce public opposition led to the project being put on hold, and then canceled in favor of the Safeguard Program, which was located far from urban areas.

In November 1976, the rock band KISS rented out an area of the facility in Reading to rehearse for their upcoming "Winter Tour 76/77" for the album Rock and Roll Over. While there, the band filmed three music videos for the Don Kirshner Rock Concert television show. The videos would air in May 1977.

In 1998, the outdoor firing facility was closed after a stray bullet nearly struck a Lynnfield mother and her toddler.  Between 1967 and 1998, nineteen stray bullets were found in the abutting neighborhood.  Prior to the closing of the range, police departments from the surrounding area used the outdoor range for training.  The incident resulted in the building of an indoor range at the facility.

Training Facilities
The facility contains fifteen training areas, two bivouac sites for company-sized elements, a land navigation site, a recovery training site, an engineer dig training site, a helipad, and an Engagement Skills Trainer.  Ten miles of unmaintained roads are also present on the site to help with training for wheeled and tracked vehicles.

Tenants
A list of tenants that operate at the facility:
 151st Regional Support Group
 Field Maintenance Facility #4
 272nd Chemical Company
 972nd Military Police Company
 188th Engineer Detachment
 Camp Curtis Guild Composite Squadron MA-072 Civil Air Patrol
 MA NG Family Program

See also
Camp Guild - WWI training camp in Boxford named for the same person
List of military installations in Massachusetts

References

External links
 Official website
 Flickr images of Camp Curtis Guild
 Documentation of rifle training at the camp during World War I

Military installations in Massachusetts
Buildings and structures in Reading, Massachusetts
Buildings and structures in Wakefield, Massachusetts
Installations of the United States Army National Guard
Works Progress Administration in Massachusetts
Buildings and structures in Lynnfield, Massachusetts
1916 establishments in Massachusetts